Rice County (standard abbreviation: RC) is a county located in the U.S. state of Kansas. As of the 2020 census, the county population was 9,427. The largest city and county seat is Lyons. The county was named in memory of Samuel Allen Rice, Brigadier-General, United States volunteers, killed April 30, 1864, at Jenkins Ferry, Arkansas.

History

Early history

For many millennia, the Great Plains of North America was inhabited by nomadic Native Americans.  From the 16th century to 18th century, the Kingdom of France claimed ownership of large parts of North America.  In 1762, after the French and Indian War, France secretly ceded New France to Spain, per the Treaty of Fontainebleau.

19th century
In 1802, Spain returned most of the land to France, but keeping title to about 7,500 square miles.  In 1803, most of the land for modern day Kansas was acquired by the United States from France as part of the 828,000 square mile Louisiana Purchase for 2.83 cents per acre.

In 1854, the Kansas Territory was organized, then in 1861 Kansas became the 34th U.S. state.  In 1867, Rice County was established.

The Santa Fe Trail followed the route of present-day U.S. Route 56. Ruts in the earth from the trail are still visible in several locations.

In 1878, Atchison, Topeka and Santa Fe Railway and parties from Marion County and McPherson County chartered the Marion and McPherson Railway Company.  In 1879, a branch line was built from Florence to McPherson, in 1880 it was extended to Lyons, in 1881 it was extended to Ellinwood.  The line was leased and operated by the Atchison, Topeka and Santa Fe Railway.  The line from Florence to Marion, was abandoned in 1968.  In 1992, the line from Marion to McPherson was sold to Central Kansas Railway. In 1993, after heavy flood damage, the line from Marion to McPherson was abandoned.  The original branch line connected Florence, Marion, Canada, Hillsboro, Lehigh, Canton, Galva, McPherson, Conway, Windom, Little River, Mitchell, Lyons, Chase, Ellinwood.

Geography

Adjacent counties
 Ellsworth County (north)
 McPherson County (east)
 Reno County (south)
 Stafford County (southwest)
 Barton County (northwest)

National protected area
 Quivira National Wildlife Refuge (part)

Demographics

As of the census of 2000, there were 10,761 people, 4,050 households, and 2,830 families residing in the county.  The population density was 15 people per square mile (6/km2).  There were 4,609 housing units at an average density of 6 per square mile (2/km2).  The racial makeup of the county was 94.68% White, 1.15% Black or African American, 0.57% Native American, 0.33% Asian, 0.04% Pacific Islander, 1.84% from other races, and 1.39% from two or more races.  5.61% of the population were Hispanic or Latino of any race.

There were 4,050 households, out of which 31.20% had children under the age of 18 living with them, 59.10% were married couples living together, 7.20% had a female householder with no husband present, and 30.10% were non-families. 27.80% of all households were made up of individuals, and 15.30% had someone living alone who was 65 years of age or older.  The average household size was 2.44 and the average family size was 2.97.

In the county, the population was spread out, with 24.70% under the age of 18, 13.30% from 18 to 24, 22.80% from 25 to 44, 21.30% from 45 to 64, and 18.00% who were 65 years of age or older.  The median age was 38 years. For every 100 females there were 92.20 males.  For every 100 females age 18 and over, there were 88.20 males.

The median income for a household in the county was $35,671, and the median income for a family was $40,960. Males had a median income of $31,175 versus $18,968 for females. The per capita income for the county was $16,064.  About 8.50% of families and 10.70% of the population were below the poverty line, including 14.60% of those under age 18 and 8.20% of those age 65 or over.

Government

Presidential elections

Laws
The Kansas Constitution was amended in 1986 to allow the sale of alcoholic liquor by the individual drink with the approval of voters, either with or without a minimum of 30% of sales coming from food. Rice County is one of 35 counties in the state that allows for the sale of liquor by the drink without the minimum food sales stipulation.

Education

Colleges
 Sterling College in Sterling

Unified school districts
 Sterling USD 376
 Chase–Raymond USD 401
 Lyons USD 405
 Little River–Windom USD 444

School district office in neighboring county
 Central Plains USD 112

Communities

Cities

 Alden
 Bushton
 Chase
 Frederick
 Geneseo
 Little River
 Lyons
 Raymond
 Sterling

Unincorporated communities
 Mitchell
 Pollard
 Saxman
 Silica

Ghost towns
 Crawford
 Galt

Townships
Rice County is divided into twenty townships.  The cities of Lyons and Sterling are considered governmentally independent and are excluded from the census figures for the townships.  In the following table, the population center is the largest city (or cities) included in that township's population total, if it is of a significant size.

Trivia
The CW television series Superman & Lois places Superman's home town of Smallville in Rice County ("Pilot").

See also
 Dry counties
 National Register of Historic Places listings in Rice County, Kansas

References

Notes

Further reading

County
 Rice County Centennial 1871 - 1971 Souvenir Book; Centennial Book Committee; 50 pages; 1971.
 Standard Atlas of Rice County, Kansas; Geo. A. Ogle & Co; 75 pages; 1919.
 Plat Book of Rice County, Kansas; North West Publishing Co; 44 pages; 1902.
 Handbook of Rick County, Kansas; C.S. Burch Publishing Co; 38 pages; 1888.
Trails
 The Story of the Marking of the Santa Fe Trail by the Daughters of the American Revolution in Kansas and the State of Kansas; Almira Cordry; Crane Co; 164 pages; 1915.
 The National Old Trails Road To Southern California, Part 1 (LA to KC); Automobile Club Of Southern California; 64 pages; 1916.

External links

County
 
 Rice County - Directory of Public Officials
Maps
 Rice County Maps: Current, Historic, KDOT
 Kansas Highway Maps: Current, Historic, KDOT
 Kansas Railroad Maps: Current, 1996, 1915, KDOT and Kansas Historical Society

 
Kansas counties
1867 establishments in Kansas
Populated places established in 1867